Muhammad Waqas Sharif (born 3 September 1988) is a Pakistani field hockey player. He plays as Right Out.

Career

2008
Waqas was member of the team for 2008 Summer Olympics in Beijing.

2010
Waqas was a member of the gold medal-winning team at the Asian Games in Guanzhou, China.

2012
Waqas was a member of the gold medal-winning team at the 2012 Asian Men's Hockey Champions Trophy in Doha, Qatar. Muhammad Waqas was top scorer in the tournament with 11 goals.  He was part of Pakistan's 2012 Summer Olympic team.

References

External links
 Pakistan Hockey Team

1988 births
Living people
Olympic field hockey players of Pakistan
Pakistani male field hockey players
Field hockey players from Sialkot
Field hockey players at the 2008 Summer Olympics
Field hockey players at the 2010 Commonwealth Games
Asian Games medalists in field hockey
Field hockey players at the 2006 Asian Games
Field hockey players at the 2010 Asian Games
Field hockey players at the 2014 Asian Games
Field hockey players at the 2012 Summer Olympics
Asian Games gold medalists for Pakistan
Asian Games silver medalists for Pakistan
Asian Games bronze medalists for Pakistan
Medalists at the 2006 Asian Games
Medalists at the 2010 Asian Games
Medalists at the 2014 Asian Games
Commonwealth Games competitors for Pakistan